Saint Albans High School is a public high school in Kanawha County, West Virginia, United States. Founded in 1909, it is located in the city of St. Albans. It is one of the eight public high schools in Kanawha County Schools. SAHS opened a newly renovated facility for the 2004 school year.

History
 The school was founded in 1913 by Charles P. Guice and was then called Central Grade School, which was located on Sixth Avenue and Third Street in St Albans, WV.  The class of 1916 were among the first graduates of the High School and  after World War 1,  student enrollment increased and a new building for the school was built. The new building was completed in 1924 and had multiple additions to add a gymnasium as well as more classrooms. In 1954, the another new High School was completed and stood there until 2003.  In the summer of 2000, the voters for the school bond gave 3 million dollars for the renovation of the High School. In 2003 the new building was competed and where St Albans High School currently stands.  The school reached peak enrollment in 1971 where over 1700 students where enrolled the school. In 1974, the largest class in history of St Albans High School graduated with 620 students.

Awards
 After the completion in 2003, the new St Albans High School was recognized for two awards. The School Planning and Management magazine awarded the school with one of the Impact on Learning awards for their outstanding renovations to the school. The second recognition came from American School and University which added the school to its Architectural Portfolio issue for the 2004 issue where it is one of 258 other facilities recognized.

Academics Information
 St Albans High School is one of eight schools in its Kanawha County district. The High School offers some AP classes and according to US news, the High School has an 80% graduation rate for the 2014-2015 school year.  Total enrollment in the 2014-2015 school year was 1033 and 59 teachers taught at the school.

Clubs and organizations
Academic Quiz Bowl
Anchor Club
Art Club
Band
Chess Club
Dance Team
Drama / Theatre
FBLA
FCA
FCCLA
FHA
FHS
Forensics
French Club
HSTA
Honor Society
Interact Club
Jabberwock
Key Club
Latin Club
MCJROTC
Mu Alpha Theta
Natural Helpers
Pep Club
Sensitive Issues Task Force
Show Choir - 2005/2006 West Virginia State Champions
Spanish Honor Society
Teenage Republicans Club
WV Math League
Young Democrats of America

St. Albans High School competes in the Gazette-Mail Kanawha County Majorette and Band Festival. They have won the Festival Grand Championship three times (1972, 1973, and 1975).

References

External links
Official website

Schools in Kanawha County, West Virginia
Public high schools in West Virginia
St. Albans, West Virginia